Gol Reyhan Football Club (Bashgah-e Futbal-e Gâl Reyhan Alberz) is an Iranian football team based in Karaj, Iran, that plays in the Azadegan League.

Players

First team squad

 

For recent transfers, see List of Iranian football transfers summer 2018''.

Current technical staff

Football clubs in Iran